"No" is a song by French singer Louane from debut studio her-self album (2017). "No" received a commercial release solely in France and Wallonia, where it charted at numbers 88 and 26, respectively.

Charts

Certifications

References

2018 songs
2018 singles
Power pop songs